Mikhail Ivanovich Doller (1889 – 15 March 1952) was a Soviet film director and screenwriter. He worked as co-director with Vsevolod Pudovkin and was awarded Stalin Prize twice in 1941.

Life
Mikhail Doller was born in Vilno, Russian Empire (now Vilnius, Lithuania). He graduated from Vilno Theater School in 1910 and during 1912-1922 worked as an actor and director in various theaters. In 1922-1924 Doller studied in Lev Kuleshov master class. Worked as film director at Mezhrabpom in 1925-1936 and at Mosfilm studio since 1936.

Filmography
director
1925 - Bricks (Кирпичики); co-directed with Leonid Obolensky
1926 - Ekh, yablochko! (Эх, яблочко!); co-directed with Leonid Obolensky
1927 - The End of St. Petersburg (Конец Санкт-Петербурга); co-directed with Vsevolod Pudovkin
1928 - Ranks and People (Чины и люди); co-directed with Yakov Protazanov
1932 - A Simple Case (Простой случай); co-directed with Vsevolod Pudovkin
1934 - Revolt of the Fishermen (Восстание рыбаков) as producer; director: Erwin Piscator
1938 - Victory (Победа); co-directed with Vsevolod Pudovkin
1939 - Minin and Pozharsky (Минин и Пожарский); co-directed with Vsevolod Pudovkin
1941 - Suvorov (Суворов); co-directed with Vsevolod Pudovkin

actor
 1925 - The Death Ray (Луч смерти)
 1928 - Salamander (Саламандра)
 1932 - Horizon (Горизонт)

External links

1889 births
1952 deaths
Film people from Vilnius
People from Vilensky Uyezd
Soviet film directors
Stalin Prize winners
Silent film directors